Amdahl may refer to:

People
 Einar Amdahl (1888-1974), Norwegian theologist
 Bjarne Amdahl (1903-1968), Norwegian pianist and composer
 Douglas K. Amdahl (1919–2010), American lawyer and judge from Minnesota
 Gene Amdahl (1922–2015), formulator of Amdahl's law of parallel computing and founder of Amdahl Corporation

Companies
 Amdahl Corporation, a manufacturer of IBM-mainframe-compatible computers